Home Alone is a 1990 American Christmas comedy film directed by Chris Columbus and written and produced by John Hughes. The first film in the Home Alone franchise, the film stars Macaulay Culkin, Joe Pesci, Daniel Stern, John Heard, and Catherine O'Hara. Culkin plays Kevin McCallister, a boy who defends his suburban Chicago home from burglars after his family accidentally leaves him behind on their Christmas vacation to Paris.

Hughes conceived Home Alone while on vacation, with Warner Bros. being originally intended to finance and distribute the film. However, Warner Bros. shut down production after it exceeded its assigned budget. 20th Century Fox assumed responsibilities following secret meetings with Hughes. Columbus and Culkin were hired soon afterwards. Filming took place between February and May 1990 on location across Illinois.

Home Alone premiered in Chicago on November 10, 1990, and was theatrically released in the United States on November 16. While the film’s reception was initially mixed, in later years reception has been generally positive, with praise for its cast, humor, and music. Home Alone grossed $476.7 million worldwide, becoming the highest-grossing live-action comedy until the release of The Hangover Part II (2011), and made Culkin a child star. Moreover, it was the second-highest-grossing film of 1990, behind Ghost. It was nominated for the Golden Globe Award for Best Motion Picture – Musical or Comedy, and Best Actor in a Motion Picture – Musical or Comedy for Culkin, and for the Academy Award for Best Original Score for John Williams, and Best Original Song for "Somewhere in My Memory". Home Alone has since been considered one of the best Christmas films. A sequel, Home Alone 2: Lost in New York, was released in 1992.

Plot

The McCallister family is preparing to spend Christmas in Paris, gathering at Kate and Peter's home in a Chicago suburb on the night before their departure. Kate and Peter's youngest son, Kevin, is the subject of ridicule by his older siblings and cousins. Kevin inadvertently ruins the family dinner after a brief scuffle with his oldest brother Buzz, in which Kevin's airplane ticket is accidentally thrown away, resulting in Kate sending him up to the attic. Kevin berates his mother for allowing the rest of the family to pick on him and wishes that his family would disappear. During the night, heavy winds create a power outage, disabling the alarm clocks and causing the family to oversleep. In the confusion and rush to get to the airport, Kevin is accidentally left behind.

Kevin wakes to find the house empty, and the family cars still in the garage, unaware that they had rented vans to take them to the airport. Thinking that his wish has come true, he is overjoyed with his newfound freedom. Later, Kevin becomes frightened by his next door neighbor, "Old Man" Marley, who is rumored to be a serial killer who murdered his own family. The McCallister home is soon stalked by the "Wet Bandits", Harry and Marv, a pair of burglars who have been breaking into other vacant houses in the neighborhood. Kevin tricks them into thinking that his family is still home, forcing them to postpone their plans to rob the McCallister house.

Kate realizes mid-flight that Kevin was left behind, and upon arrival in Paris, the family discovers that all flights for the next two days are booked, and that the phone lines are still down back home in Chicago. Peter and the rest of the family stay in his brother's apartment in Paris, while Kate manages to get a flight back to Scranton, Pennsylvania. She tries to find a flight to Chicago, but all the flights are booked. Kate is overheard by Gus Polinski, the lead member of a traveling polka band, who offers to let her travel with them to Chicago in a moving van.

Meanwhile, on Christmas Eve, Harry and Marv finally realize that only Kevin is in the McCallister home, and Kevin overhears them discussing plans to break into the house that night. Kevin starts to miss his family and asks the local Santa Claus impersonator if he could bring his family back for Christmas. He goes to church and watches a choir perform, and encounters Marley, who proves the rumors about him are false. Marley points out his granddaughter in the choir, and mentions he has never met her since she is the daughter of his estranged son. Kevin suggests to Marley that he should reconcile with his son.

Kevin returns home and rigs the house with booby traps. Harry and Marv break in, spring the traps, and suffer various injuries. While Harry and Marv pursue Kevin around the house, he calls the police and lures the duo into a vacant neighboring house which they had previously broken into. Harry and Marv ambush Kevin and prepare to get their revenge, but Marley intervenes and knocks them out with his snow shovel. The police arrive and arrest Harry and Marv, having identified all the houses that they broke into due to their habit of flooding them.

On Christmas Day, Kevin is initially disappointed to find that his family is still gone, but Kate arrives home and they reconcile. The rest of the family then returns after waiting in Paris until they could obtain a direct flight to Chicago. Kevin keeps silent about his encounter with Harry and Marv, although Peter finds Harry's knocked-out gold tooth. Kevin then watches Marley reuniting with his son, daughter-in-law, and granddaughter.

Cast

Production

Development
Writer and producer John Hughes conceived Home Alone while preparing to go on vacation. He said: "I was going away on vacation, and making a list of everything I didn't want to forget. I thought, 'Well, I'd better not forget my kids.' Then I thought, 'What if I left my 10-year-old son at home? What would he do? Hughes wrote eight pages of notes that developed into the screenplay. Imagining that children are naturally most scared of robbers, Hughes also worked that aspect into the plot of the film.

Home Alone was initially set to be financed and distributed by Warner Bros. Hughes promised that he could make the movie for less than $10 million, considerably less than most feature film production budgets of that era. Concerned that the film might exceed that amount, Hughes met secretly with 20th Century Fox before production to see if they would fund the project if Warner proved inflexible. According to executive producer Scott Rosenfelt, a copy of the script was "clandestinely" delivered to Fox, bypassing the legal restrictions that would have otherwise prevented Fox from seeing it until the project was in turnaround. Early in production, the budget grew to $14.7 million. Warner demanded that it be cut by $1.2 million; the producers responded with a memo arguing that the budget could not be cut any further. Unconvinced, Warner shut down production the next day, but it quickly resumed when Fox took up Hughes on his offer. The final budget grew to $18 million.

Hughes had asked Patrick Read Johnson to direct, but he was committed to directing Spaced Invaders. He turned to Chris Columbus, who had left National Lampoon's Christmas Vacation before shooting started because of a personality clash with starring actor Chevy Chase, who Columbus said treated him "like dirt". Hughes gave him the scripts for both Home Alone and Reach the Rock; Columbus chose to direct Home Alone, as he found it funnier and liked the Christmas theme. Columbus did an uncredited rewrite of the script, which included the character Old Man Marley. He added the character to give the story a more serious layer, as well as a more emotional, happier ending.

Casting

Hughes suggested to Columbus that they cast Macaulay Culkin as Kevin, because of his experience while shooting Uncle Buck. Columbus met with 200 other actors for the part, as he felt it was his "directorial responsibility". John Mulaney was asked to audition for the role of Kevin after being scouted in a children’s sketch comedy group, but his parents refused the opportunity. Columbus finally met with Culkin and agreed he was the right choice.

After Robert De Niro and Jon Lovitz turned down the role of Harry, Joe Pesci accepted it. The role of Uncle Frank was written for Kelsey Grammer, but was given to Gerry Bamman when Grammer was unavailable.

Daniel Stern was cast as Marv, but before shooting started, he was told that the production schedule had been extended from six weeks to eight. He dropped out after as he would not be paid more for the extended schedule. Daniel Roebuck was hired to replace him, but after two days of rehearsal, Columbus felt he was lacking chemistry with Pesci and brought back Stern. Roebuck later said that, although he was upset to be fired from the production, he now believed the experience was "a little blip of unimportance". Chris Farley auditioned for the role of the Santa Claus impersonator, but he failed to impress Columbus.

John Candy was available for only one day to film his scenes, which took 23 hours to shoot. He was paid only $414, since he did the film as a favor to Hughes. In return, he was the only actor Hughes allowed to go off-script; according to Columbus, all his dialogue was improvised.

Filming

Principal photography took place from February 14, 1990, to May 8, 1990, over a course of 83 days. The house exterior scenes were filmed on location at a three-story single-family house located at 671 Lincoln Avenue in the North Shore village of Winnetka, Illinois, where Hughes's previous films Breakfast Club, Ferris Bueller's Day Off, Sixteen Candles, Planes, Trains and Automobiles, She's Having a Baby, and Uncle Buck had also been shot. The only interiors of the house used for filming in the film were the main staircase, basement, attic and most of the first floor landing, while all the other interiors of the house (including the aforementioned rooms) were duplicated on a sound stage to allow more room for equipment and crew. It was built in the gym and empty swimming pool of the former New Trier High School building, previously used by Hughes for Uncle Buck and Ferris Bueller's Day Off, where the production company had already set up its offices. The house later became a tourist attraction. The tree house in the back yard was built specifically for the film and dismantled after filming ended. Kevin runs away from Marley in Hubbard Woods Park in Winnetka. The church exteriors were shot at Trinity United Methodist Church in Wilmette, Illinois, while the interiors were shot at Grace Episcopal Church in Oak Park, Illinois.

For the film within a film, Angels with Filthy Souls (the title of which parodies the 1938 crime film Angels with Dirty Faces), shooting took only one day, on the final "test day" prior to the official start of principal photography. To create the illusion that the film was an authentic 1940s gangster film, the scene was filmed on black-and-white negative film, and Johnny's office featured props from that era. Like much of the film, most of the sequence was shot with low, wide angles that, according to journalist Darryn King, "capture the action as if a child were perceiving it".

Cinematographer Julio Macat recalled that Pesci was more difficult to work with than Culkin. The older actor believed some of the dialogue was not of a quality commensurate with his acting ability. He also resented the early unit calls, since they prevented him from starting his day with nine holes of golf as he preferred to do. After he took the assistant director by the collar one day to complain about this, daily call times were moved back from 7 to 9 a.m. to accommodate his rounds. On the other end of the schedule, the crew had limited time to film the many nighttime scenes, since Culkin could not work any later than 10 p.m. due to his age.

Pesci said in a 2022 interview with People of working with Culkin, "I intentionally limited my interactions with him to preserve the dynamic" and made sure not "to come across on the screen that we were in any way friendly" in order to "maintain the integrity of the adversarial relationship."

On the set, Pesci and Stern both had difficulty refraining from cursing, which became annoying to Pesci, since Culkin was on set as well. In fact, the only curse words that made it into the film was "shit", accidentally said by Daniel Stern when his shoe fell through the pet door, and "hell", which was said by both Pesci and Stern after their characters encounter one another after going through Kevin's booby traps and by Johnny to the character of Snakes in Angels with Filthy Souls. Pesci's use of "cartoon cursing", or menacing gibberish, garnered comparisons to Looney Tunes character Yosemite Sam.

The film's stunts also created tension for the crew during shooting. Columbus said, "Every time the stunt guys did one of those stunts it wasn't funny. We'd watch it, and I would just pray that the guys were alive." Stunts were originally prepared with safety harnesses, but because of their visibility on camera, the film's final stunts were performed without them. Troy Brown and Leon Delaney were stuntmen for Pesci and Stern, respectively. An injury had occurred between Pesci and Culkin during one of the rehearsals for the scene in which Harry tries to bite off Kevin's finger. Culkin still has the scar. The tarantula that walks on Stern's face was real. 

Senta Moses, who played Tracy, recalled in 2020 that one of the most difficult scenes to shoot was the family's run through O'Hare International Airport to catch their flight. While it does not last long, it required several days to film. "There were thousands of extras, all expertly choreographed so none of us would be in danger running at full speed through the American Airlines terminal", she told The Hollywood Reporter. "And we ran at full speed. Sometimes we’d bump into each other, like a multi-car pileup on the expressway, and just crack up laughing ... There were so many setups and narrowly missed moments of disaster, but to my knowledge, no one got hurt."

Music

Columbus initially hoped to have Bruce Broughton score the film, and early posters listed him as the composer. However, Broughton was busy with The Rescuers Down Under, and he had to cancel at the last minute. Columbus was later able to get in touch with Steven Spielberg, who helped him contact John Williams to produce the final score. Traditional Christmas songs, such as "O Holy Night" and "Carol of the Bells", are featured prominently in the film, as well as the film's theme song "Somewhere in My Memory". The soundtrack was released by Sony Classical Records on cassette on December 4, 1990, and on CD on May 27, 2015.

Release

Theatrical
Home Alone premiered in Chicago on November 10, 1990. It was given a wide release on November 16, 1990.

Home media
Home Alone was first released by Fox Video on VHS and LaserDisc in the United States on August 22, 1991, their first video to go direct to sell-through rather than to the video rental market first. It sold 11 million copies, generating Fox revenue of $150 million making it, along with E.T. the Extra-Terrestrial, the highest-selling video of all time at that point. Due to the sales, the film did not perform as well in the rental market.

It was later released on DVD on October 5, 1999, as a basic package. The film was released on Blu-ray on December 2, 2008, titled Family Fun Edition, and was released alongside Home Alone 2: Lost in New York in a collection pack on October 5, 2010. The film was reissued again on DVD and Blu-ray on October 6, 2015, alongside all four of its sequels in a box set titled Home Alone: 25th Anniversary Ultimate Collector's Christmas Edition.

On September 15, 2020, Walt Disney Studios Home Entertainment and 20th Century Studios Home Entertainment released Home Alone on Ultra HD Blu-ray in time for its 30th anniversary in the United States.

Reception

Box office
Home Alone grossed $285.8 million in the United States and Canada and $190.9 million in other countries for a worldwide total of $476.7 million, against a production budget of $18 million. In its opening weekend, Home Alone grossed $17 million from 1,202 theaters, averaging $14,211 per site and just 6% of the final total and added screens over the next six weeks, with a peak screen count of 2,174 during its eighth weekend at the start of January 1991.

Home Alone was the number-one film at the box office for 12 consecutive weeks, from its release weekend of November 16–18, 1990 through the weekend of February 1–3, 1991. It was removed from the top spot when Sleeping with the Enemy opened with $13 million. It remained in the top ten until the weekend of April 26, well past Easter weekend. It made two more appearances in the top ten (the weekend of May 31 – June 2 and the weekend of June 14–16) before finally falling out of the top ten. After over nine months into its run, the film had earned 16x its debut weekend and ended up making a final gross of $285,761,243, the top-grossing film of its year in North America. The film is listed in the Guinness World Records as the highest-grossing live-action comedy ever and held the record until it was overtaken by The Hangover Part II in 2011.

By the time the film had run its course in theaters, Home Alone was the third-highest-grossing film of all time worldwide, as well as in the United States and Canada behind only Star Wars ($322 million at the time) and E.T. the Extra-Terrestrial ($399 million at the time), according to the home video box. Box Office Mojo estimates that the film sold over 67.7 million tickets in the United States. It was also the highest-grossing Christmas film until it was surpassed by Dr. Seuss' The Grinch in 2018. The film made Culkin a child star.

Critical response
On review aggregator Rotten Tomatoes, the film holds an approval rating of 67% based on 61 reviews, with an average rating of 5.8/10. The website's critical consensus reads, "Home Alone uneven but frequently funny premise stretched unreasonably thin is buoyed by Macaulay Culkin's cute performance and strong supporting stars." On Metacritic, the film has a weighted average score of 63 out of 100 based on nine critics, indicating "generally favorable reviews". Audiences polled by CinemaScore gave the film an average grade of "A" on an A+ to F scale.

Variety magazine praised the film for its cast. Jeanne Cooper of The Washington Post praised the film for its comedic approach. Hal Hinson, also of The Washington Post, praised Columbus' direction and Culkin's performance. Although Caryn James of The New York Times complained that the film's first half is "flat and unsurprising as its cute little premise suggests", she praised the second half for its slapstick humor. She also praised the dialogue between Kevin and Marley, as well as the film's final scenes. Roger Ebert of the Chicago Sun-Times gave the film a  out of a 4-star rating and 2 thumbs down. He compared the elaborate booby-traps in the film to Rube Goldberg machines, writing "they're the kinds of traps that any 8-year-old could devise, if he had a budget of tens of thousands of dollars and the assistance of a crew of movie special effects people" and criticized the plot as "so implausible that it makes it hard for [him] to really care about the plight of the kid [Kevin]". However, he praised Culkin's performance.

Owen Gleiberman of Entertainment Weekly magazine gave the film a "D" grade, criticizing the film for its "sadistic festival of adult-bashing". Gleiberman said that "[John] Hughes is pulling our strings as though he'd never learn to do anything else". Peter Bradshaw of The Guardian gave the film three out of five and praised Culkin's "vivid screen presence, almost incandescent with confidence". However, he criticised his acting, calling it "a bit broad and mannered". Ali Barclay of the BBC wrote "Culkin walks a fine line between annoyance and endearment throughout the film." He also called Home Alone "a film which manages to capture some of the best qualities of Christmas".

Naomi Barnwell of Roobla said that "Home Alone has all the ingredients that make for a great kids’ film". Adrian Turner of Radio Times commented "[Home Alone is] a celebration of enterprise that captured the heart and wickedness of every child on the planet." According to TV Guide, "[Home Alone]'s slapstick falls flat and only the pain remains." Marielle Sabbag of Vocal wrote "Everything about [Home Alone] is beautiful and has a realistic quality." Peter Rainer of the Los Angeles Times criticised the fact that "there is a reason why this film plays better as a trailer than as a full-length film."

Home Alone gradually became a Christmas classic. It was praised for its quotable phrases, morals, traps, and main character. Hannah-Rose Yee of Stylist called the ending "very sweet" and praised the score from John Williams, calling it "fantastic". Christopher Hooton of The Independent also praised the film, calling the film-within-a-film Angels with Filthy Souls "a fond footnote in cinema history". Matt Talbot from Simcoe.com said that the Wet Bandits were "fantastic" and "never [got] old" on "repeat viewings". Michael Walsh of Nerdist noted the church scene as "One of the best, most touching scenes [in the film]".

Home Alone remains a highly popular Christmas movie in Poland, when it is played on Polsat every Christmas Eve. In 2010, Polsat did not play Home Alone, which caused over 90,000 people to protest on Facebook. In 2016, over 4.44 million Poles tuned in to Polsat to watch Home Alone. Since the 2010s, its TV trailers even include a tagline that acknowledges this popularity: "Christmas without him? It's absolutely impossible!".

Julio Macat, the films cinematographer, considers Home Alone his favorite film out of all the projects he has shot. It was the favorite film of former U.S. President Gerald Ford.

Accolades
At the 12th Youth in Film Awards, Macaulay Culkin won Best Young Actor Starring in a Motion Picture. The film was nominated for two Academy Awards, one for Best Original Score, which was written by John Williams, and the other for Best Original Song for "Somewhere in My Memory", music by Williams and lyrics by Leslie Bricusse, but lost to Dances with Wolves and Dick Tracy respectively.

Accusations of plagiarism
The 1989 French horror thriller film 3615 code Père Noël, which is about a young boy who is home alone with his elderly grandfather and has to fend off a home invader dressed up as Santa Claus, has been noted for its plot similarities to Home Alone. 3615 code Père Noël director René Manzor threatened the producers of Home Alone with legal action on the grounds of plagiarism, alleging that Home Alone was a remake of his film. 3615 code Père Noël was not released in the United States during its original theatrical run in January 1990 and did not become widely available there until 2018.

Homages
The music video for Snoop Dogg's 1994 song "Gin and Juice" opens with a gag where, after a teenaged Snoop's parents have left him to watch the house in their absence, he places his hands to his face and yells in the manner of Kevin McCallister in the first film, while a title comes on screen reading "Home Boy Alone".

In December 2015, Culkin reprised his role as an adult Kevin McCallister in the inaugural episode of the Jack Dishel web series, "DRYVRS", where a visibly disturbed Kevin recounts his experience of being left home alone by his family. In response to Culkin's video, Daniel Stern appeared in a short video reprising his role as Marv, released in conjunction with Stern's Reddit AMA, where he pleads for Harry to return to help protect him against Kevin's traps.

The 2016 Christmas-set horror film Better Watch Out includes a scene where a character who is obsessed with the Home Alone films demonstrates how, in real life, it would be deadly for someone to be hit in the face with a paint can swung from a distance.

The season 13 episode of It's Always Sunny in Philadelphia, "Charlie's Home Alone", is intended to be a direct parody of the first Home Alone film. In the episode Charlie Kelly is accidentally forgotten while the rest of "the gang" attend Super Bowl LII. Charlie mistakingly believes he must protect the bar by setting up traps, only for himself to accidentally activate said traps, nearly preventing from performing his Super Bowl "rituals".

On December 15, 2018, Culkin made a guest appearance as himself in an episode of The Angry Video Game Nerd to review multiple video game adaptations of the first two Home Alone films, as well as a gameplay session of The Pagemaster with James Rolfe and Mike Matei in the days following that episode's release.

On December 19, 2018, Culkin again reprised his role as Kevin McCallister in a 60-second advertisement for Google Assistant, titled Home Alone Again. The commercial contains shot for shot remakes of scenes from the film. Google Assistant helps Kevin set up the house to look active by remotely turning on lights, devices, and setting up cutouts of people, to have the thieves parked in a van outside (presumably Harry and Marv) steer clear of the house. Additionally, Pesci also reprised his role as Harry, only for his voice making a small cameo. Pesci later appeared in another ad where he watches the short with his friends and jokes about his brief cameo.

The 2022 action comedy film Violent Night references Home Alone several times, and character Trudy Lightston attempts to emulate Kevin McCallister's fighting tactics against the burglars who take her family hostage.

Use in Poland 
Films such as Home Alone and Die Hard are very popular at Christmas time in Poland, because they were some of the first Western movies to be released in Poland since the end of communist rule. However, the Polish premiere of "Home Alone" took place not during the Christmas season, but on May 22, 1992. Three years later, on Christmas Day (December 25), 1995, at 20:10 CET on TVP1, the Polish television premiere of the film took place. Then three times on December 26, 1997, and December 24 and 25, 1999, the film was broadcast on television TVN.
In 29 December 2000, 8.9 million Poles were watching Home Alone on Christmas Eve;  At that time, the broadcasting of the film was taken over by the only nationwide TV station, Polsat (TVN was broadcasting terrestrial broadcasts only in larger cities at that time), which continues it every year (with the exception of 2002, when the third part of the film was broadcast on January 1, 2003) to the present. It is Polsat that is mainly responsible for the popularity of the film "Home Alone" in Poland.  On Polsat from 2000 to 2001 and from 2003 to 2013, the film "Home Alone" was broadcast alternatively both during the Christmas season (for the first time on December 24, 2003) and in the period preceding it (then the sequel of the film, i.e. "Home Alone 2: Lost in New York" or both films appeared on Polsat in the pre-Christmas or post-Christmas period, but not later than before New Year's Eve. 
In 2010, Telewizja Polsat did not include the film in the Christmas schedule, which was met with a protest of over 90,000 people on Facebook. Under the pressure of public opinion, Polsat changed its mind, however, broadcasting the film on Christmas Day (December 25) at 20:00 CET and additionally on Boxing Day (December 26) at 12:45 CET.   
Starting from 2014 (except for 2015, when the film was broadcast only on Christmas Day, i.e. December 25 at 16:40 CET, the comedy "Home Alone" is shown on Polsat every Christmas Eve (December 24) around 20:00 CET.

In 2017, about four million people (11.6% of Poland's population) were watching it on Christmas Eve and in 2018 again in Christmas Eve  the film recorded the highest viewership with 4.51 million viewers.

Other media

Novelization
Home Alone was novelized by Todd Strasser and published by Scholastic in 1990 to coincide with the film. On October 6, 2015, to celebrate the 25th anniversary of the movie, an illustrated book by Kim Smith and Quirk Books was released.

Sequels and franchise

The film was followed by a commercially successful sequel in 1992, Home Alone 2: Lost in New York, which brought back most of the first film's cast. Culkin was paid $4.5 million to appear in the sequel, compared to $110,000 for the original. The film within a film, Angels with Filthy Souls, had a sequel in Home Alone 2, Angels with Even Filthier Souls. Both Angels meta-films featured character actor Ralph Foody as stereotypical 1930s mobster Johnny. A third film, Home Alone 3, was released in 1997; it has entirely different actors and characters as well as a different storyline, with Hughes writing the screenplay.

A fourth made-for-TV film followed in 2002: Home Alone 4: Taking Back the House. The movie features some of the same characters who were in the first two films, but with a new cast and a storyline. The fifth film, The Holiday Heist, premiered during ABC Family's Countdown to 25 Days of Christmas programming event on November 25, 2012. Similarly to the third film, it does not focus on the McCallister family. Chris Columbus later revealed that there had been discussions on a sequel starring Kevin's son: "This was talked about maybe 10 years ago  I don’t know, we were just having fun with it  and we said, 'What if Kevin is an adult and he has a kid?' But it was still Pesci and Stern  Pesci and Stern are still obsessed with this kid. They’re going to get this kid."

A sixth film was released digitally on Disney+ on November 12, 2021, titled Home Sweet Home Alone. Devin Ratray, who played Buzz McCallister in the first two films, reprised his role in the film.

See also
 List of films featuring home invasions, a plot device in thriller films that Home Alone lampoons
 List of films featuring fictional films
 List of Christmas films
 Home Alone (video game)

References

External links 

 
 

Home Alone (franchise)
1990 films
1990s Christmas comedy films
1990s crime comedy films
20th Century Fox films
American children's comedy films
American Christmas comedy films
American crime comedy films
Burglary in film
Compositions by Leslie Bricusse
1990s English-language films
Films directed by Chris Columbus
Films involved in plagiarism controversies
Films produced by John Hughes (filmmaker)
Films scored by John Williams
Films set in 1990
Films set in Illinois
Films shot in Illinois
Films shot in Paris
Films with screenplays by John Hughes (filmmaker)
Home invasions in film
1990 comedy films
Films set in Chicago
Films set in Paris
Films about mother–son relationships
Films about vacationing
1990s American films